Goneplacoidea is a superfamily of crabs containing 11 extant families, and two families known only from fossils (marked "†").
 Acidopsidae
 † Carinocarcinoididae
 Chasmocarcinidae
 Conleyidae
 Euryplacidae
 Goneplacidae
 Litocheiridae
 † Martinocarcinidae
 Mathildellidae
 Progeryonidae
 Scalopidiidae
 Sotoplacidae
 Vultocinidae

References

External links

 
Crabs
Arthropod superfamilies